William Stanford may refer to:
 William Stanford (sculptor), Australian sculptor
 William Stanford (judge), English politician and judge
 William Bedell Stanford, Irish classical scholar and politician

See also